Dillenia suffruticosa (simpoh air or CB leaf) is a species of Dillenia found in tropical South East Asia in secondary forest and swampy ground. It is a large, evergreen shrub to 6 metres high. It flowers continuously with yellow flowers 10 to 12 cm wide.

Dillenia suffruticosa is the national flower of Brunei, and can be found everywhere across the country. Claire Waight Keller included the plant to represent the country in Meghan Markle's wedding veil, which included the distinctive flora of each Commonwealth country.

It is a highly invasive weed in Sri Lanka.

Description
Dillena suffruticosa is described to be a 6–10 meters high shrub, with alternating leaves, simple, pinnately-veined, petiole winged, blade-like 12-40x6-12 cm leaves, and a eudicot plant. The flowers are large, 10–13 cm wide, they are yellow in color and scentless. They are found on long peduncles and face downwards; the plant produces no nectar. The flower blooms daily at around 3am and opening flowers are fully opened one hour before sunrise. Other sources (Corners) say that bees appear to be the pollinators which gather their pollen, as well as small beetles and flies that scramble over the flowers, the flower moves in the appropriate position to prepare for fruit growth (pointing up when the flower starts to produce fruits, the fruits take up to 5 weeks to develop. The fruit is pink and is a star-shaped capsule with purple seeds that have a fleshy, bright red aril. The fruits are eaten by birds and even by monkeys.

Distribution and habitat
The plant is found in tropical South East Asia in secondary forest and swampy grounds that are undisturbed forest such as riversides up to 700 m altitude. They can also be found on alluvial places such as swamps, mangroves, riversides, but sometimes also present on hillsides and ridges, which have clayey to sandy soil texture.  Dillenia suffruticosa is also found in Sri Lanka, Peninsular Malaysia, Sumatra, Java, Borneo and in the tropical regions of Singapore, and Hawaii (where it is an introduced species).

Uses
Dillenia suffruticosa has other uses, these include medicine and storage. The medicinal properties include the leaves and roots being used against inflammations, itch, stomach ache, and recovery after delivery. The storage properties consist of large leaves of the plant being used to wrap food (tempeh or fermented soy bean cake) instead of using a plastic bag and/or the leaves can be shaped into a cone to contain or hold food (rojak). They can be used to attract birds in urban areas and are planted as an ornamental plant.

Synonyms 
Dillenia burbidgei (Hook.f.) Martelli
Dillenia suffruticosa var borneensis Ridl
Wormia burbidgei Hook.f 
Wormia subsessilis Miq, Wormia subsessilis var. borneensis Ridl
Wormia suffruticosa Griff

References

suffruticosa
Flora of Malesia
Invasive plant species in Sri Lanka